The meridian 129° east of Greenwich is a line of longitude that extends from the North Pole across the Arctic Ocean, Asia, Australia, the Indian Ocean, the Southern Ocean, and Antarctica to the South Pole.

The 129th meridian east forms a great circle with the 51st meridian west.

In Australia, the meridian nominally defines the eastern border of Western Australia, and the western borders of the Northern Territory and South Australia. However, the border of Western Australia actually meets the Northern Territory border and South Australian border at the 26th parallel south, at what is known as Surveyor Generals Corner.

From Pole to Pole
Starting at the North Pole and heading south to the South Pole, the 129th meridian east passes through:

{| class="wikitable plainrowheaders"
! scope="col" width="130" | Co-ordinates
! scope="col" | Country, territory or sea
! scope="col" | Notes
|-
| style="background:#b0e0e6;" | 
! scope="row" style="background:#b0e0e6;" | Arctic Ocean
| style="background:#b0e0e6;" |
|-
| style="background:#b0e0e6;" | 
! scope="row" style="background:#b0e0e6;" | Laptev Sea
| style="background:#b0e0e6;" |
|-valign="top"
| 
! scope="row" | 
| Sakha Republic — islands of the Lena Delta and the mainland Amur Oblast — from 
|-valign="top"
| 
! scope="row" | 
| Heilongjiang Jilin — from 
|-
| 
! scope="row" | 
|
|-
| style="background:#b0e0e6;" | 
! scope="row" style="background:#b0e0e6;" | Sea of Japan
| style="background:#b0e0e6;" |
|-
| 
! scope="row" | 
| Passing just west of Busan
|-valign="top"
| style="background:#b0e0e6;" | 
! scope="row" style="background:#b0e0e6;" | East China Sea
| style="background:#b0e0e6;" | Korea Strait — passing just west of the island of Tsushima Island, Nagasaki Prefecture,  (at )
|-valign="top"
| 
! scope="row" | 
| Nagasaki Prefecture — islands of Nakadorijima, Wakamatsujima and Kabajima, Gotō Islands
|-
| style="background:#b0e0e6;" | 
! scope="row" style="background:#b0e0e6;" | East China Sea
| style="background:#b0e0e6;" |
|-valign="top"
| 
! scope="row" | 
| Kagoshima Prefecture — islands of Kaminonejima and Yokoatejima, Tokara Islands
|-
| style="background:#b0e0e6;" | 
! scope="row" style="background:#b0e0e6;" | East China Sea
| style="background:#b0e0e6;" |
|-valign="top"
| 
! scope="row" | 
| Kagoshima Prefecture — island of Tokunoshima
|-valign="top"
| style="background:#b0e0e6;" | 
! scope="row" style="background:#b0e0e6;" | Pacific Ocean
| style="background:#b0e0e6;" | Passing just east of the island of Halmahera,  (at )
|-
| style="background:#b0e0e6;" | 
! scope="row" style="background:#b0e0e6;" | Halmahera Sea
| style="background:#b0e0e6;" |
|-
| style="background:#b0e0e6;" | 
! scope="row" style="background:#b0e0e6;" | Ceram Sea
| style="background:#b0e0e6;" |
|-
| 
! scope="row" | 
| Island of Seram
|-
| style="background:#b0e0e6;" | 
! scope="row" style="background:#b0e0e6;" | Banda Sea
| style="background:#b0e0e6;" |
|-
| 
! scope="row" | 
| Island of Sermata
|-
| style="background:#b0e0e6;" | 
! scope="row" style="background:#b0e0e6;" | Timor Sea
| style="background:#b0e0e6;" |
|-valign="top"
| 
! scope="row" | 
| Western Australia / Northern Territory border Western Australia / South Australia border — from 
|-
| style="background:#b0e0e6;" | 
! scope="row" style="background:#b0e0e6;" | Indian Ocean
| style="background:#b0e0e6;" | Australian authorities consider this to be part of the Southern Ocean
|-
| style="background:#b0e0e6;" | 
! scope="row" style="background:#b0e0e6;" | Southern Ocean
| style="background:#b0e0e6;" |
|-
| 
! scope="row" | Antarctica
| Australian Antarctic Territory, claimed by 
|-
|}

See also
128th meridian east
130th meridian east

References

e129 meridian east
Borders of the Northern Territory
Borders of Western Australia
Borders of South Australia